In May and June 2002, Moroccan authorities arrested several people in connection with an Al-Qaeda plot to attack American and British naval ships and shipping in the Strait of Gibraltar. Three Saudi Arabians were arrested for the plot, followed by several Moroccan Islamists, many members of Salafia Jihadia.

Plot and arrests
The three Saudi nationals arrested were Zuher al-Tbaiti, the suspected ringleader, and Abdullah al-Ghamdi and Hilal al-Assiri. The three eventually confessed to the plot, having escaped Afghanistan in 2001 during the Battle of Tora Bora. The men had reportedly been instructed to the plot by a senior aide to Osama bin Laden based in Pakistan, named "Abu Bilal", suspected by authorities to be Abd al-Rahim al-Nashiri who later reportedly confessed to having been behind the plot. The plot involved using speedboats packed with explosives in suicide bombings against American and British vessels, and possibly suicide bombings in Gibraltar.

The Saudis were married to Moroccan women through the Moroccan Islamic Combatant Group (GICM). The wives of two of the men were arrested, suspected of having been used as money couriers for al-Qaeda and to have been aware of the plots; one of the two women attempted to hide explosives in her apartment when she was arrested by security forces. According to one official, the plot had been planned "well before" the September 11 attacks. Attacks were reportedly also planned in Morocco, notably in the tourist centre of Marrakesh. The three Saudi Arabians were sentenced to ten years imprisonment in February 2003.

The plot was widely compared to the USS Cole bombing of 2000. The bombing of USS Cole, as well as the later bombing of the French-registered oil tanker Limburg in October 2002, have also been linked to al-Nashiri.

In 2003, NATO began escorting civilian ships through the Strait of Gibraltar amid fears of terrorist attacks. The Strait was mentioned as a target by Al-Qaeda in 2014, when through its magazine Resurgence it urged its followers of attacks against central transport hubs to destabilise the world economy.

See also
 Operation Active Endeavour
 2003 Casablanca bombings

References

2002 in Gibraltar
2002 in Morocco
Al-Qaeda activities in Europe
Islamic terrorism in the United Kingdom
Failed terrorist attempts in Europe
History of Gibraltar
Islamic terrorist incidents in 2002
Islamism in Morocco
Islamic terrorism in Morocco
Strait of Gibraltar
Terrorism in Morocco
Terrorist incidents in Africa in 2002
Terrorist incidents in the United Kingdom in 2002
Terrorist incidents in Morocco in 2002